Mühlenau (also: Stegau) is a river of Schleswig-Holstein, Germany. It flows into the Bekau near Kaaks.

See also
List of rivers of Schleswig-Holstein

Rivers of Schleswig-Holstein
Rivers of Germany